The Brunswick Town Historic District encompasses the ruins of colonial Brunswick Town, North Carolina, the Civil War-era Fort Anderson, St. Philip's Church Ruins, and the remains of Russellborough, the home of two colonial governors. The  district is located in the Smithville Township of Brunswick County, between Wilmington and Southport. In September 1978, the Brunswick Town Historic District was added to the U.S. National Register of Historic Places.

Gallery

See also
 National Register of Historic Places listings in Brunswick County, North Carolina

References

Further reading

External links

 
 Brunswick Town/Fort Anderson at North Carolina Historic Sites (nchistoricsites.org)
 Brunswick Town at NCpedia (ncpedia.org)

 
Archaeological sites on the National Register of Historic Places in North Carolina
Geography of Brunswick County, North Carolina
Historic American Engineering Record in North Carolina
Historic districts on the National Register of Historic Places in North Carolina
National Register of Historic Places in Brunswick County, North Carolina
Protected areas established in 1978
Protected areas of Brunswick County, North Carolina